The 2022 Ball State Cardinals baseball team represented Ball State University during the 2022 NCAA Division I baseball season. The Cardinals played their home games at the Ball Diamond as a member of the Mid-American Conference They were led by head coach Rich Maloney, in his tenth year as manager.

Ball State won the MAC regular season championship for the first time in program history.

Personnel

Roster

Schedule and results

Schedule Notes

Tournaments

MAC Tournament

References

External links 
 Ball State Baseball

Ball State Cardinals baseball seasons
Ball State Cardinals
Ball State Cardinals
Mid-American Conference baseball champion seasons